Cinzia Vittoria Zehnder (born 4 August 1997) is a Swiss professional footballer who plays as a midfielder. Since her debut in June 2014, a 7–0 win over Serbia, she has been a member of the Switzerland national team.

Zehnder came to the attention of FC Zürich after playing against them in a friendly for FC Kirchberg. She signed for FC Zürich as a youth prospect but quickly made her first-team debut on her 15th birthday, registering an assist. Playing alongside Zürich's veteran German duo Inka Grings and Sonja Fuss aided Zehnder's development. National coach Martina Voss-Tecklenburg called her up to the national team and in summer 2015 was reportedly helping her to secure a transfer to the professional German Bundesliga for a higher standard of club football. In May 2015, Zehnder joined SC Freiburg. In June 2017 she returned to FC Zürich.

References

External links
Profile at FC Zürich 

1997 births
Living people
Swiss women's footballers
Footballers from Zürich
Swiss expatriate sportspeople in Germany
Expatriate women's footballers in Germany
Switzerland women's international footballers
SC Freiburg (women) players
Swiss Women's Super League players
FC Zürich Frauen players
Women's association football midfielders
2015 FIFA Women's World Cup players
UEFA Women's Euro 2017 players
Swiss expatriate women's footballers